The Manhattan School of Music (MSM) is a private music conservatory in New York City. The school offers bachelor's, master's, and doctoral degrees in the areas of classical and jazz performance and composition, as well as a bachelor's in musical theatre.

Founded in 1917, the school is located on Claremont Avenue in the Morningside Heights neighborhood of New York City, adjacent to Broadway and West 122nd Street (Seminary Row). The MSM campus was originally the home to The Institute of Musical Art (which later became Juilliard) until Juilliard migrated to the Lincoln Center area of Midtown Manhattan. The property was originally owned by the Bloomingdale Insane Asylum until The Institute of Musical Art purchased it in 1910. The campus of Columbia University is close by, where it has been since 1895. Many of the students live in the school's residence hall, Andersen Hall.

History

Manhattan School of Music was founded between 1917 and 1918 by the pianist and philanthropist Janet D. Schenck. It was initially known as the "Neighborhood Music School". Initially located at the Union Settlement Association on East 104th St in Manhattan's East Harlem neighborhood, the school moved into a brownstone building at East 105th St. Pablo Casals and Harold Bauer were among the first of many distinguished artists who offered guidance to the school. Eventually, its name was changed to Manhattan School of Music.

In 1943, the artistic and academic growth of the school resulted in a charter amendment to grant the bachelor of music degree. Two subsequent amendments authorized the offering in 1947 of the master of music degree and, in 1974, the degree of doctor of musical arts. In 1956, Dr. Schenck retired and Metropolitan Opera baritone John Brownlee was appointed director, a title later revised to president. President Brownlee initiated the idea of relocating the school to the Morningside Heights neighborhood; his death occurred only months before his efforts were realized. In 1969, George Schick, Metropolitan Opera conductor, accompanist, and opera coach, succeeded Brownlee as president and led the school's move to its present location. He created the opera program, while all other major school functions were managed by Senior Director Stanley Bednar.

John O. Crosby, founder and general director of the Santa Fe Opera, was appointed president in 1976. He was followed by Gideon W. Waldrop, who was appointed in 1986, and Peter C. Simon in 1989. On July 1, 1992, Marta Casals Istomin was named president, a position which she held until October 2005 when she retired.

Dr. Robert Sirota, former director of the Peabody Institute of the Johns Hopkins University, took over the presidency in 2005. He was succeeded by James Gandre, formerly of Roosevelt University, effective May 2013.

Academics 
Manhattan School of Music offers undergraduate, masters, and doctoral programs. Classical majors, jazz majors, Pinchas Zukerman Performance Program majors, cross majors from Barnard College at Columbia, and most recently musical theater majors all take part at the conservatory.

MSM offers classical, jazz, and musical theatre training. It grants the Bachelor of Music, Master of Music, and Doctor of Musical Arts degrees. It also offers a Professional Studies Certificate and Artist Diploma.

Instrumental performing ensembles

Manhattan School of Music offers a wide variety of live audience performance experiences for its students. It contains 132 practice rooms and eight performance spaces. There are three major orchestras: The MSM Symphony, the Philharmonia, and the Chamber Sinfonia. In addition, many smaller ensembles are assembled for orchestral chamber music. The MSM Wind Ensemble also performs throughout the year. The Jazz Arts program contains various ensembles, such as the Jazz Philharmonic (full jazz big band with full orchestra), the Jazz Orchestra, Concert Jazz Band, Afro-Cuban Jazz Orchestra, and Chamber Jazz Ensemble. Tactus, the ensemble for contemporary chamber music, is made up of graduate students in the school's Contemporary Performance Program (CPP). The school also holds an annual concerto competition with which the winner is offered the opportunity to perform with the Symphony Orchestra.

Performance venues
Manhattan School contains multiple performance spaces, each dedicated to separate ensemble requirements. The largest is Neidorff-Karpati Hall, where all orchestral and large jazz ensemble concerts are held. Major renovation of the Hall was completed in November 2018. Greenfield Recital Hall and Miller Recital Hall are used for solo and small ensemble recitals, especially for graduation-required recitals. The Ades Performance Space presents everything from fully staged operas to contemporary chamber music. The Carla Bossi-Comelli Studio on the seventh floor is a multipurpose rehearsal and performance space; other performance spaces include the Myers Recital Hall, Mikowsky Recital Hall, Rahm Hall, and Pforzheimer Hall.

Notable people

Faculty and administrators

Harold Bauer
Raymond Beegle
Gabriela Beňačková
John Carisi
Paul Cohen
Judith Clurman
Richard Danielpour
Mignon Dunn
Andrew Gerle
Midori Gotō
Randy Graff
Horacio Gutiérrez
Thomas Hampson
Stefon Harris
Yehuda Hyman
Olga Kern
David Krakauer
Dave Liebman
Joe Locke
David Loud
Spiro Malas
Catherine Malfitano
James Morris
Philippe Muller
Ashley Putnam
Bob Mintzer
Jason Moran
Jonel Perlea
Neil Rosenshein
Tazewell Thompson
Pinchas Zukerman
Jim McNeely
Mary Watson Weaver

Students and alumni

 Annette A. Aguilar
 Ambrose Akinmusire
 Franck Amsallem
 Aris Antoniades
 Robert Ashley
 Angelo Badalamenti
 Jared Bernstein
 Judith Bettina
 Angela Bofill
 Luis Bonilla
 Liam Bonner
 Linda Bouchard
 Sara Davis Buechner
 Donald Byrd
 John-Michael Caprio
 Andrea Carroll
 Ron Carter
 Marko Ciciliani
 Paul Cohen
 Harry Connick Jr.
 Anton Coppola
 John Corigliano
 Anthony Roth Costanzo
 Jon Cowherd
 Joshua Coyne
 Kim Crosby
 Jovianney Emmanuel Cruz
 Sebastian Currier
 Marlon Daniel
 Mark Delpriora
 Alondra de la Parra
 Josu de Solaun Soto
 Salvatore Di Vittorio
 Edward Downes
 Steven Feifke
 Ezio Flagello
 Nicolas Flagello
 Sullivan Fortner
 Steve Gadd
 Kirill Gerstein
 Elliot Goldenthal
 Susan Graham
 Dave Grusin
 Page Hamilton
 Herbie Hancock
 Edward W. Hardy
 Stefon Harris
 Megan Marie Hart
 Miho Hazama
 Ian Hendrickson-Smith
 Shuler Hensley
 Sara Hershkowitz
 Margaret Hillis
 Larry Hochman
 Daniel Hoffman (violinist)
 Jennifer Holloway
 Rupert Holmes
 Lisa Hopkins
 Paul Horn
 Helen Huang
 Lauren Jelencovich
 Aaron M. Johnson
 Scott Joiner
 Hyung-ki Joo
 Margaret Juntwait
 Marina Kamen
 Aaron Jay Kernis
 Dawn Kotoski
 Dominic Lalli
 Ben Lanzarone
 Yusef Lateef
 John Lewis
 Catherine Malfitano
 Ursula Mamlok
 Herbie Mann
 Kit McClure
 Bob McGrath
 Nellie McKay
 Johanna Meier
 Jane Monheit
 Rob Moose
 Carmen Moral
 Jason Moran
 Walter Murphy
 Max Neuhaus
 Elmar Oliveira
 Simon O'Neill
 Marcus Paus
 William Pell
 Leo Pellegrino
 Meghan Picerno
 Tobias Picker
 Kariné Poghosyan
 Chris Potter
 Charlie Puth
 John Bernard Riley
 Max Roach
 Larry Rosen
 Don Sebesky
 Lynn Strongin
 Richard Tee
 Jonathan Tetelman
 Natalie Toro
 Joseph Trapanese
 Sarah Traubel
 Art Tripp
 Gordon Turk
 Marilyn Tyler
 Dawn Upshaw
 David Van Tieghem
 Dirk Weiler
 Joe Wilder
 Bernie Williams
 Carol Williams
 Richard Williams
 Phil Woods
 Yung Wook Yoo
 Rolande Maxwell Young
 Dolora Zajick
 Miguel Zenón

 Shahab Paranj

Transportation 
The  train serves the school at 125th Street, which is three blocks away from the campus. The  buses also serve the school.  The  stops on 122nd and Riverside Drive, one block from the campus. The  buses stops at 120th Street on Broadway.

References

External links

 
Educational institutions established in 1917
Universities and colleges in Manhattan
Morningside Heights, Manhattan
1917 establishments in New York City
Private universities and colleges in New York City
Education in Harlem